Barry Stokes is a British actor.

His film credits include: Juan Antonio Bardem's The Corruption of Chris Miller, The Ups and Downs of a Handyman, Prey, Outer Touch, Hawk the Slayer, Rendezvous in Paris and Enemy Mine.

His television appearances include: Tom Brown's Schooldays (as Brooke), Dixon of Dock Green, Z-Cars, UFO, Space: 1999, Survivors, The Professionals and Reilly, Ace of Spies.

Filmography
 Tom Brown's Schooldays (1971) as Brooke
 The Corruption of Chris Miller (1973) as Barney Webster
 Space: 1999 (1975, TV) as Jim Haines
 Jackanory Playhouse (1975, TV) as Nick Sutler
 The Ups and Downs of a Handyman (1975) as Bob
 The Prince and the Pauper (1976, TV) as Miles Hendon
 Prey (1977) as Anders
 Lady Oscar (1979) as André Grandier
 Outer Touch (1979) as Oliver
 Hammer House of Horror (1980, TV; episode "Carpathian Eagle") as 1st Victim
 Hawk the Slayer (1980) as Axe Man 2
 The Guns and the Fury (1981) as Paul Halders
 Rendezvous in Paris (1982) as Frank Davis
 Fanny Hill (1983) as Charles
 Reilly: Ace of Spies (1983, TV) as Cromie
 The Last Days of Pompeii (1984, TV) as Gar
 Romance on the Orient Express (1985, TV) as Flavio
 Enemy Mine (1985) as Huck

References

External links
 

Living people
British male film actors
British male television actors
Year of birth missing (living people)